Assumption Convent School (ASC) is a private girls' school in Thailand. It was founded in 1904 by the Roman Catholic Mission of Siam and has since been managed by the Sisters of St. Paul of Chartres. The school is located in the vicinity of the Assumption Cathedral in Bangkok's Bang Rak District.

History 
Rising anti-clericalism in France during the Third Republic, culminating in 1905 French law on the Separation of the Churches and the State, increased pressure on the mission to accelerate their effort overseas. The Apostolic Vicar of Eastern Siam, Bishop , M.E.P., proposed to set up a school for girls to learn how to sew and how to speak English, German, Portuguese, and French. Thus Assumption Convent School was founded on 2 March 1904 and had Soeur Saint Xavier as its first superior.

There were just 37 children at the beginning. There were 7 superiors and sisters and a few secular teachers. They used English, Portuguese, German language as the main languages to teach students and they also taught about Thai language and Music. Moreover, all students must have learnt about ethics training, social work and manner that has been the uniqueness of this school which have been inherited to the present.

Assumption Convent School is located at Charoen Krung 40 Alley, Charoen Krung Road, Bang Rak District, Bangkok, Thailand. On 18 June 1905, the first building of the school was opened. So, this day was considered to be the official opening day.

In 1952, because of the number of students that kept increasing every year. The Superior at that time decided to build another school called Assumption Suksa School that is under the responsibility of Assumption Cathedral.

In 1995, a new school called Assumption Convent Silom School has opened students from grade 1 to grade 6 moved to this school. Assumption Convent Silom School is located at 8 Pramuan Road, Silom Sub-District, Bang Rak District, Bangkok.

Name 
Assumption Convent School was originally written in French as "Couvent de l'Assomption"  Later, it was changed to English as Assumption Convent.

The assumption has roots in the Latin language and it's the abbreviation of Assumptio Beatae Virginis Mariae. This honours the Virgin Mary's body and soul in heaven. And couvent means the place where the sisters live together.

Identity

Symbols of the school 
Assumption Convent School has three important symbols which are:

 Symbol of St. Paul de Chartres:  The standing fresh four green spikes means honesty, serenity and equality of the first four sisters. The golden ground means bright lights after the dark days at the Bose in France that St.Paul de Chartres was established. The blue colour is the colour of Mary Mother of Jesus that the sisters love. De Chartres refers to the names of the two housekeepers that are the heart and centre of unity of the sisters located near Cathédrale Notre-Dame de Chartres. The red colour is the colour of love, the blood of the death and the bravery of St. Paul, the Apostle who was a patron saint of the sisters that holds the sword of the word of God. About the opened book, there is an inscription in the book which say “Be all to all”. That means the duties of the sisters to help humans from sins to honour God.
 Symbol of the school: The circle means the common aims that want to help the youth to be the persons based on religious, cultural and intellectual values. At the same time, it means the faith of priests and the love of parents, the mercy of teachers and the pursuit of knowledge of students. The seven-line of the petals mean seven kindness of god which are words, wisdom, thoughts, readings, knowledge, faith and cautiousness. The egis means moral and knowledge as a protective weapon. The blade of sword means wisdom. The sword handle means consciousness. So the sword means the protection that will get rid of folly and unrighteousness to protect themselves. The leave refers to olive leave. The leave officiate breathes, so the olive leave means living in peace for peace
 Fleur De ris:  St.Paul de Chartres chose the lily as a symbol of the school because of the white colours of lily that means pure, honest, loyal and upright.

Colours of the school 
The colours of the school are red and white.

Red colour means the colour of love and bravery that are the most important power to achieve goals for the justice and not being afraid of dangers.

White colour means honesty, loyalty, morality and not letting anything get in the way, purity and being ready to develop ones own good to keep it going.

Tree of the school 
The pikun tree, Mimusops elengi is a small to medium tree with the height of about 5–15 m. The leaf is a narrow spear. The base of the leaf has a round shape and the tip of leaf is smooth wave. The flowers has a white colour and cool fresh smell, flowering between October and December. Moreover, it is a tree that provides shade which can be compared with the school that is a shelter for its students. The fresh cold smell is like the reputation of  the schools that has been known for a long time and will last forever.

Architecture
The Study Hall, one of the school's original buildings, is a listed historic building which received the ASA Architectural Conservation Award in 2007. It is a three-storey building in Colonial style, with arched windows and a front portico demonstrating Classical influence.

Awards 
 1991: Award of outstanding teaching and learning in science from the Institute for the Promotion of Teaching Science and Technology
 1996: Award for large high school education from Princess Maha Chakri Sirindhorn
 2006: Award and the white flag for drug-free high school from Mr. Samak Sundaravej
 2001: Received Sanya Thammasak Award for Morality from Tarn Narmjai Foundation

References

External links
 

Schools in Bangkok
Catholic schools in Thailand
Girls' schools in Thailand
Bang Rak district